Seiichi (written: , , , , , , ,  or ) is a masculine Japanese given name. Notable people with the name include:

, Japanese karateka
, Japanese cult member
, Japanese politician
, Japanese photographer
, Japanese philosopher
, Japanese art director
, Japanese karateka
, Japanese video game designer
, Imperial Japanese Navy admiral
, Japanese academic, historian and writer
, Japanese golfer
, Japanese politician
, Japanese general
, Japanese footballer
, Japanese inventor
, Japanese writer
, Japanese photographer
, Japanese footballer
, Japanese poet and painter
, Japanese footballer
, Japanese politician
, Japanese sport wrestler
, Japanese politician
, Japanese footballer
, Japanese footballer
, Japanese baseball player and soldier
, Japanese aikidoka
, Japanese philologist
, Japanese figure skater
, Japanese politician
, Japanese handball player
, Japanese photographer
, Japanese actor
, American musician
, Japanese educator
, Japanese scientist
, Japanese baseball player
, Japanese musician

Japanese masculine given names